Highland Park School District may refer to:
 Highland Park Schools (Michigan)
 Highland Park School District (New Jersey)
 Highland Park Independent School District (Dallas County, Texas)
 Highland Park Independent School District (Potter County, Texas)